May Road is a road in Mid-Levels, Hong Kong Island, Hong Kong. It is named after Sir Francis Henry May, the 15th Governor of Hong Kong.

See also

List of streets and roads in Hong Kong

References

Mid-Levels
Roads on Hong Kong Island